This is a list of television shows that Siti Nurhaliza has been involved in. She has been featured in more than 70 television shows, some of which are produced by her own production company, Siti Nurhaliza Productions. She has also starred in a number of musical television shows that have been produced throughout the Asean region, especially in Malaysia, Singapore and Indonesia.

In 2009, she was honoured by Astro to have her own channel, SITI for two days showing mostly of her previous concerts and music videos. In 2011, on her 33rd birthday, a documentary about her life, Siti Nurhaliza premiered on the History Channel with interviews by her and from people who have worked with her about her journey in the Malaysian entertainment industry.

Channel

Online

Television

Theatre

Film

Radio

References 

Nurhaliza, Siti
Filmography
Malaysian film-related lists